Juan Herrera is the name of:

People

Football
Juan Herrera Sánchez (1939–2014), Spanish footballer
Juan Sebastián Herrera, Colombian footballer
Juan Herrera-Perla, Salvadoran footballer

Other
Juan Herrera (boxer) (born 1958), Mexican boxer
Juan Herrera (tennis), Spanish tennis player
Juan de Herrera, Spanish architect
Juan Felipe Herrera, American poet
Juan Vicente Herrera, Spanish politician

Places
Juan de Herrera, Dominican Republic